Recchia gracilis is a species of beetle in the family Cerambycidae. It was described by Martins and Galileo in 1985.

References

Recchia (beetle)
Beetles described in 1985